The Quaker Valley School District is an Allegheny County, Pennsylvania school district covering the Boroughs of Sewickley, Leetsdale, Edgeworth, Glen Osborne, Sewickley Hills, Sewickley Heights, Bell Acres, Haysville and Glenfield, as well as the townships of Leet and Aleppo.  The district operates Quaker Valley High School (9th-12th), Quaker Valley Middle School (6th-8th), Edgeworth Elementary School (K-5th), and Osborne Elementary School (K-5th). The district is also responsible for the maintenance of the building that houses Sewickley Public Library.

References

School districts in Allegheny County, Pennsylvania
Education in Pittsburgh area
School districts established in 1956